Mohamed Rizgalla (born 8 October 1942) is a Sudanese boxer. He competed in the men's light welterweight event at the 1960 Summer Olympics.

References

1942 births
Living people
Sudanese male boxers
Olympic boxers of Sudan
Boxers at the 1960 Summer Olympics
People from South Kordofan
Light-welterweight boxers